Kirkwood is a semi-rural locality in the Gladstone Region, Queensland, Australia. In the  Kirkwood had a population of 2,513 people.

Geography 
The locality is bounded to the north by Kirkwood Road and to the east by Auckland Creek. Situated on the souther edge of the urban development of the city of Gladstone, small pockets of residential development have been established in the north of the locality. As at December 2020, most of the locality is undeveloped and used for grazing. However, real estate businesses are describing it as "Gladstone's newest suburb" and anticipate rapid residential growth.

O'Connell Ridges is a mountain range  that commences in Beecher, passes through the south of Kirkwood, into Burua and ends in Wurdong Heights.

History 
The suburb was named after a notable Gladstone family at the suggestion of the Gladstone City Council.

In the  Kirkwood had a population of 2,250 people.

The  revealed that the population of Kirkwood had risen to 2,513 people.

Education 
There are no schools in Kirkwood. The nearest primary schools are Clinton State School in neighbouring Clinton  to the north-west and Kin Kora State School in Kin Kora to the north-east. The nearest secondary schools are Gladstone State High School in West Gladstone to the north and Toolooa State High School in South Gladstone to the north-east.

Amenities 
Kirkwood Shopping Centre is at 505 Kirkwood Road (corner of Dixon Drive).

There are a number of parks in the area: 

 Little Creek Parklands on Little Boulevarde
Koowin Drive Park
 Gladstone Mountain Bike Park at the southern end of Koowin Road

References 

Gladstone Region
Localities in Queensland